ÍNN (Íslands Nýjasta Nýtt (Iceland’s Newest of the New)) was a privately owned, Icelandic television station, which launched on October 2, 2007. The channel was controlled by Ingvi Hrafn Jónsson, former news director of the Icelandic governmental TV station RÚV and Stöð 2.

ÍNN mainly broadcast talk shows about politics and daily life.

Among the shows on the channel were: Hrafnaþing, Óli á Hrauni, Í nærveru sálar, Borgarlíf og í kallfæri.

Sources
ljósvakinn (2009)Eru allir stilltir á ÍNN?, Morgunblaðið 11 October (Accessed March 2013)

Moody, Jonas (2008) Feature of the Week: Brave New Broadcast, Iceland Review online (30/06/2008) published first in Iceland Review, 2007 Winter issue IR 45.04 (Accessed March 2013)

External links 
 ÍNN
 ÍNN on IMDB

Mass media companies of Iceland
Television channels in Iceland
Television channels and stations established in 2007